Murghob District is a district in Tajikistan, occupying the eastern two-thirds of the Gorno-Badakhshan Autonomous Region (GBAO). The area of Murghob District is 37,300 km2, covering 26 percent of Tajikistan's soil, but only 0.17% of its population. Murghob District borders on Kyrgyzstan to the north, China to the east, and Afghanistan to the south. The population of Murghob District is 15,900 (1 January 2020 estimate). Its administrative capital is the village Murghob (also known as Murghab).

Administrative divisions
The district is divided administratively into six jamoats. They are as follows:

Geography
It borders on Afghanistan to the south, China's Xinjiang region to the east, and Kyrgyzstan to the north. Within Tajikistan it borders to the west on four other GBAO districts and on the Region of Republican Subordination. 

The land is mostly a desolate plateau with scattered mountains, especially toward the east and south.  The highest mountains are around the Fedchenko Glacier in the northwest and along the Pamir River in the south.  The population consists of around 65% Kirgiz who ascend to Pamirs in the late XIII century and the rest are Pamiris who are indigenous people of that and Chinese area of Pamirs. Formerly the highlands was used by both ethnicities mostly as summer pasture. The Pamir Highway curves from the southwest to the northeast. The four major lakes are Karakul in the northeast and three river lakes: Sarez Lake on the river Bartang, Yashil Kul on the river Gunt, and Zorkul on the Pamir River.

The districts eastern border shares the Sarikol Range with China.

See also
 China–Tajikistan border
 Rangkul Valley Important Bird Area

References

 Map of the Gorno-Badakhshan region of Tajikistan

Districts of Tajikistan

Gorno-Badakhshan Autonomous Region